Air Vice-Marshal John Finbar Monahan  (born  1968), known as Fin Monahan, is a senior Royal Air Force officer. After training as a pilot, serving in active squadrons and exchange postings, Monahan was the commandant of the Central Flying School at RAF Cranwell, with the Red Arrows coming under his command. Monahan has trained with several non-UK militaries, and currently serves as the Director of the Air Command Operating Model Programme.

RAF career
Monahan was born in Liverpool. He joined the Royal Air Force in September 1991, after serving with the East Lowlands Universities Air Squadron. On graduation from pilot training, he was posted to No. 4 Squadron flying the Harrier jump jet at RAF Laarbruch in Germany, during which he flew missions over Bosnia and Kosovo. After Germany, he was posted to RAF Valley in North Wales, and then served in an exchange role with the Royal New Zealand Air Force, flying Skyhawk aircraft from RNZAF Base Ohakea. Whilst serving as a pilot with No. 1 Squadron in Afghanistan, Monahan was called upon to run a mission at very short notice in support of Australian special forces. He went on the mission alone and was later awarded a Distinguished Flying Cross.

In 2007, Monahan took command of Cambridge University Air Squadron. He then spent a year training at the Defence Services Staff College in India and, on returning to the UK, took up a post in charge of operations at RAF Leeming in North Yorkshire. Monahan was appointed an Officer of the Order of the British Empire in the 2014 New Year Honours.

Between 2016 and 2018, Monahan was the Commandant of the Central Flying School at RAF Cranwell. Monahan was promoted to air commodore in December 2019 as "Head Doctrine (Air, Space and Cyber) in the Development, Concepts and Doctrine Centre" at the Defence Academy at Shrivenham. He was promoted to air vice-marshal on 10 October 2022, on appointment as director of the centre.

Personal life
Monahan was diagnosed with myeloma in 2009 and underwent bone marrow transplants at the Royal Marsden Hospital in London. The diagnosis was first confirmed when he was undergoing training at the staff college in India. He was diagnosed again in 2015 and was successfully treated, allowing him to return to duty, whereupon he became the commandant of the Central Flying School.

Monahan is married with three children. In 2021, he was made the patron of a myeloma cancer charity in Lancashire.

References

1968 births
Living people
Royal Air Force air commodores
Royal Air Force personnel of the War in Afghanistan (2001–2021)
Royal Air Force officers
Officers of the Order of the British Empire
People with multiple myeloma
Defence Services Staff College alumni